The Epic may refer to:

 The Epic (album), by Kamasi Washington
 The Epic (building), skyscraper in New York City
 The Epic (EP), by Citizen Kane

See also
 Epic (disambiguation)